Bukowa is a right tributary of the river San in southeastern Poland. It flows for 52 kilometres and joins the San near Stalowa Wola.

Rivers of Poland
Rivers of Podkarpackie Voivodeship
Rivers of Lublin Voivodeship